The Potez 506 was a version of the Potez 501 French single engine observation aircraft, specially modified to capture the World absolute altitude record.

Design and development
The Potez 506 was a modification of the Potez 501 observation/bomber aircraft, itself derived via the Potez 50 from the widely used Potez 25, first flown in 1926. Flown by Gustave Lemoine, it reached  on 28 September 1933, an altitude limited by icing of the pilot's eyes as he sat in his open cockpit. He used oxygen but had no pressure suit. The flight, made from Villacoublay, lasted 2 hrs 5min.

The record breaking airframe began as a Potez 501, which was the Potez 50 with its inline, water-cooled  Lorraine 12Fd Courlis replaced by a  Gnome-Rhone 14Kbrs Mistral Major radial engine. It drove a three  blade propeller. The pilot sat in the rear cockpit, rather than from his usual forward position which was covered over and used to house the barographs and batteries. Like all of the Potez 25 derived aircraft, the 506 had an all wood structure with fabric covering apart from around the engine and was a single bay sesquiplane with shorter, narrower chord lower wings and outward leaning interplane struts.

Lemoine later reached  in the 506. Both pilots considered further records attempts and Dorati also experimented with pressure suits.

Specifications (for record flight)

References

Bibliography

050
1930s French experimental aircraft
Sesquiplanes